Cordalene is a rock band with mostly pop and classical rock influences. The band was formed in Philadelphia, Pennsylvania, in 2000 by Jamie Olson (guitar/vocals), James Clark (guitar/lead vocals), Jim McGuinn (bass), and Robert A. Emmons Jr. (drums). They began playing Philadelphia area clubs and opened shows for Stroke 9 and others.  

In 2001 Cordalene's Stumble and Fall, their debut, was recorded at Indre Studios in Philadelphia and at McGuinn's house.  The album contained 7 songs including a Lou Reed cover Who Loves the Sun? and had an alt-country style in the vein of Ryan Adams or Old 97's. The album was released on the band's own   Manic Pop Thrill label.  The fledgling tour in support of Stumble and Fall ended abruptly after the second show when both Clark and Emmons quit the band.

McGuinn and Olson recruited Mike Kiley to take over singing and guitar duties and Joe Boyle for drums.  The new line-up took a new direction with Kiley's songwriting adding more pop to the sound—'razor sharp cotton candy' is how the sound has been described. Only weeks after the new line-up formed they were in the studio recording The Red EP which was released in 2002 on Manic Pop Thrill. The band played shows in the Philadelphia area non-stop including an opening slot for Weezer at the Tweeter Center in Camden, New Jersey, to over 15,000 people.

In 2003 the band issued another EP The Blue EP which contained 5 songs and released "The Red EP" with new packaging and a bonus track of The Who's I'm a Boy. Imaginary from The Blue EP was included on the 2003 Warped Tour compilation, and the band played shows on the tour.

In 2004 the band began recording their debut full length The Star Ledger. In 2004 they released a live EP recorded at Princeton's college radio station WPRB. While the band finished The Star Ledger and looked for a label they toured around the United States, including playing at SXSW in Austin, Texas. Also, the band was also regularly part of the Thrilladelphia Music Festival.

Jim McGuinn exited the band in the winter of 2005 to take a teaching job. McGuinn has worked as the program director of Y100 radio in Philadelphia, before the influential rock station was turned into a rap station.  Jeff Anderson replaced McGuinn.

Cordalene opened for various bands including Phantom Planet, Ben Lee, Mighty Mighty Bosstones, Rooney, Ultimate Fakebook, Duvall, and My Morning Jacket.

In June 2006, Dalloway Records released The Star Ledger and the band toured the United States.

The band dissolved in 2007, with Kiley going on to form a new band The Mural and the Mint.  Jamie Olson formed a new project called North Lawrence Midnight Singers, with Boyle drumming.  

Cordalene Discography

Stumble and Fall (2001)
1. Everyone Turn
2. Ten Feet Tall
3. Headlong
4. Room Is So Hot
5. You Decide
6. Who Loves the Sun?
7. World's Greatest Hoax

The Red EP (2002)
1. Isn't the Sun
2. Headlong
3. Kinda Love You
4. Not So Pretty
5. Drugs
6. Talk
7. I'm a Boy (2003 re-release bonus track)

The Blue EP (2003)
1. Back Where I Began
2. Would it Have Killed You?
3. Ghost
4. Imaginary
5. Little Red Book (unlisted)

Keeping Score at Home: Live on WPRB (2004)
1. What's Your Comfort?
2. Imaginary
3. Last Breakup
4. This Good
5. Ghost
6. Back Where I Began
7. This City is a Catalyst
8. You Become So Bright/Would It Have Killed You

Kissed Awake Single (2005
1. Kissed Awake
2. Underwear
3. I'm Occupied It Seems
4. Kissed Awake (Demo)

The Star Ledger (2006)
All Fear Disappears 
Kissed Awake 
Underwear 
This Good 
This City is a Catalyst 
Killed by Lightning 
Most Earth Shattered in a Single Day 
If You Didn't Love Me 
Last Breakup Song I Write 
What's Your Comfort? 
Counterfeit 
You Become So Bright

References 

Rock music groups from Pennsylvania
Musical groups established in 2000
Musical groups disestablished in 2007
Musical groups from Philadelphia